Shauna Pender is a Miss America preliminary scholarship winner who was crowned Miss Florida in 2003 after preceding Miss Florida Ericka Dunlap won Miss America. She had previously won Miss St. Petersburg, Florida.  She was born in 1979.

Education
Pender graduated from Houston County High School near Warner Robins, Georgia.

In 2003, Pender graduated cum laude with a Bachelor of Arts degree in theatre from Florida State University.

Media 
Pender appeared on several network program broadcasts as an actress and in numerous media reports on her accident and recovery. She acted in the ABC daytime soap opera All My Children and in the Spring of 2003 she finished in the Top Twelve on the short-lived ABC reality television show "All American Girl".

Accident 
Only two weeks after being crowned Miss Florida 2003, Pender was critically injured in an automobile accident on November 7, 2003. Pender was a passenger in a white Lincoln Town Car on her way to a charity event when a refrigerated container tractor-trailer overloaded with avocados overturned on her vehicle in the westbound lanes of the Dolphin Expressway in Miami, Florida. After being rushed to a hospital with life-threatening injuries, Pender momentarily died in the operating room but was resuscitated by medical professionals. Pender underwent months of surgeries and physical therapy to begin her multi-year recovery from the accident. She speaks frequently of the accident and recovery in her motivational speaking engagements.

Public causes 
Pender's main focus for her reign as Miss Florida was to have been "Society Embracing Special Needs People", and she continues to speak on disabilities and special needs issues. Following her accident, she also focused on bringing media attention to the dangers of overweight trucks.

References

External links
 Shauna Pender's Official Website

Florida State University alumni
Living people
1979 births
People from St. Petersburg, Florida